Fionbarr Farrell (born 3 March 1945) is an Irish épée, foil and sabre fencer. He competed in five events at the 1968 Summer Olympics.

References

External links
 

1945 births
Living people
Irish male épée fencers
Irish male foil fencers
Irish male sabre fencers
Olympic fencers of Ireland
Fencers at the 1968 Summer Olympics